The 2004–05 season was the 72nd season in the existence of AS Saint-Étienne and the club's first season back in the top flight of French football. In addition to the domestic league, Saint-Étienne participated in this season's edition of the Coupe de France and the Coupe de la Ligue. The season covered the period from 1 July 2004 to 30 June 2005.

Transfers

In

Out

Competitions

Overall record

Ligue 1

League table

Results summary

Results by round

Matches

Coupe de France

Coupe de la Ligue

Statistics

Goalscorers

References

AS Saint-Étienne seasons
Saint-Étienne